MuchMusic Brasil was a Brazilian cable television network and a Brazilian version of the Canadian music network MuchMusic. Launched in 2000, it had a hard time competing with MTV Brasil and in December 2001 the network ceased production, and went off the air.

MuchMusic is still available in several other South American countries, but as a Spanish focused format of MuchMusic Latin America. There is no Portuguese programming on MuchMusic Latin America.

Portuguese-language television stations in Brazil
Television networks in Brazil
Defunct television channels in Brazil
Television channels and stations established in 2000
Television channels and stations disestablished in 2001
2000 establishments in Brazil
2001 disestablishments in Brazil
Music organisations based in Brazil
Much (TV channel)